Shahnawaz Pradhan (1966/1967 – 17 February 2023) was an Indian television and film actor, best known for his portrayal of Sindbad the Sailor in the popular fantasy television series, Alif Laila (1993–97), Nand Baba In Ramanand Sagar Epic TV serial Shree Krishn and playing Hafiz Saeed in Phantom. He has also acted in the Marathi serial Kahe Diya Pardes, aired on Zee Marathi.

Filmography

Television

Films

Web series
Better Life Foundation (Web Series)
AIB: The Commentaries - Ghar Wapsi
Mirzapur (Web-Series) 2018 - Inspector Parshuram Gupta
Hotstar - 2019 (Web series on Hotstar)
Hostages -2020 (Web series on Hotstar)

Dubbing roles

Animated series

Live action films

Foreign language films

Indian films

Animated films

References

External links

1960s births
2023 deaths
Indian male television actors
Indian male film actors
Indian Muslims